Doctor Antonio (Italian: Il dottor Antonio) is a 1937 Italian historical drama film directed by Enrico Guazzoni and starring Ennio Cerlesi, Maria Gambarelli, and Lamberto Picasso. The film is an adaptation of the 1855 novel of the same title by Giovanni Ruffini set during the Risorgimento. It was shot at the Cinecittà Studios in Rome with location shooting on the island of Ischia off Naples. The film's sets were designed by the art director Gherardo Gherardi.

The story takes place during the reign of Ferdinand II. A revolutionary leader falls in love with the daughter of an Englishman.

Cast
 Ennio Cerlesi as Il dottor Antonio 
 Maria Gambarelli as Miss Lucy 
 Lamberto Picasso as Sir John Davenne 
 Tina Zucchi as Speranza 
 Vinicio Sofia as Turi 
 Mino Doro as Prospero 
 Margherita Bagni as Miss Elizabeth 
 Claudio Ermelli as Tom 
 Luigi Pavese as Aubrey 
 Giannina Chiantoni as Rosa 
 Romolo Costa as Hasting 
 Augusto Di Giovanni as Ferdinando II di Napoli 
 Guido Celano as Domenico Morelli 
 Enzo Biliotti as Carlo Poerio 
 Alfredo Menichelli as Luigi Settembrini 
 Massimo Pianforini as Lord Cleverton 
 Rocco D'Assunta as Michele Pironti 
 Vittorio Bianchi as Il dottore Stage 
 Alfredo Robert as Il generale Nunziante 
 Enzo De Felice as Romeo 
 Olinto Cristina as Ambasciatore inglese 
 Giuseppe Duse as Ufficiale borbonico 
 Achille Majeroni as L'avvocato dell'accusa 
 Giovanni Onorato as Un oratore in piazza 
 Aristide Garbini as Conspiratore 
 Pietro Tordi as L'altro conspiratore 
 Luigi Esposito 
 Cesare Fantoni
 Giovanni Ferraguti
 Giovanni Ferrari
 Alessio Gobbi
 Gilberto Macellari
 Michele Malaspina
 Ermena Malusardi
 Ornella Da Vasto 
 Alessandra Varna

References

Bibliography 
 Goble, Alan. The Complete Index to Literary Sources in Film. Walter de Gruyter, 1999.

External links 
 

1937 films
Italian historical drama films
1930s historical drama films
1930s Italian-language films
Films directed by Enrico Guazzoni
Films based on Italian novels
Films set in the 19th century
Films set in Italy
Films scored by Giovanni Fusco
Films shot at Cinecittà Studios
Italian black-and-white films
1937 drama films
1930s Italian films